Mary O'Brien, 3rd Countess of Orkney (c. 1721 – 1790) was the eldest daughter of Anne O'Brien, 2nd Countess of Orkney, and William O'Brien, 4th Earl of Inchiquin, and Countess of Orkney in her own right.

She was deaf and was married by signs, in 1753, to her first cousin, Murrough O'Brien, fifth Earl of Inchiquin, first Marquess of Thomond, and first Baron Thomond, of Taplow, in England, K.P. She lived with her husband at his seat, Rostellan, near Cork Harbour. She succeeded to the Earldom on 6 December 1756, when her mother died without male issue. By his Lordship, she had an only surviving daughter, Mary, the fourth Countess. The Marquess of Thomond died in consequence of his horse falling with him in Grosvenor Square, on 10 February 1808, in his 85th year. The Countess of Orkney died on 10 May 1790.

References 

1721 births
1791 deaths
People associated with Orkney
Orkney
Earls of Orkney
Orkney
Inchiquin
Daughters of Irish earls
Deaf royalty and nobility
People from County Clare
People from County Cork
18th-century Irish people
Mary, Countess of Orkney
Irish deaf people
18th-century Scottish people
18th-century Scottish women
18th-century Irish women